The Research Organization for Governance, Economy, and Public Welfare (ORTKP-EKM) is one of Research Organizations under the umbrella of the National Research and Innovation Agency (BRIN). On 24 January 2022, the formation of the agency is announced and expected to be formed on 1 February 2022. The agency is resulted from amalgamation of various research and development agencies. 

ORTKP-EKM is elevation of Economic Research Center of Research Organization for Social Sciences and Humanities.

History 
The origin of ORTKP-EKM can be traced back to the foundation of Economic Research Center (PPE) which was founded on 1962. The PPE was a unit of Indonesian Council of Sciences (MIPI), predecessor of Indonesian Institute of Sciences (LIPI). PPE later become part of LIPI after LIPI formation. In September 2021, the research center acquired by BRIN and renamed into  or PRE. Since its foundation, PRE play role to assess and contributed to policy making for economical affairs to Indonesian government.

In accordance of announcement of 24 January 2022, PRE was undergo the elevation process from a research center to research organization. The elevation process is needed by PRE to consolidate human resources and research capabilities in economical researches previously scattered at various ministries into one research organization. As economical issues also relate to governmental issues, connectivity, and public policies, it is decided by BRIN leadership to include relevant agencies to the body of PRE, resulted in formation of ORTKP-EKM.

ORTKP-EKM formation is finalized on 1 March 2022 and is functional since 4 March 2022 with inauguration of its first head, Agus Eko Nugroho.

Preceding Agencies 
Based on the structure of ORTKP-EKM, the preceding agencies of the ORTKP-EKM were:

 Economic Research Center of Research Organization for Social Sciences and Humanities.
 Research and Development Agency of the Ministry of Home Affairs
 Agency for Social Education, Research, and Extension of the Ministry of Social Affairs
 Agency for Development and Information of Villages, Development of Disadvantaged Regions, and Transmigration of the Ministry of Villages, Development of Disadvantaged Regions and Transmigration
 Transportation Research and Development Agency of the Ministry of Transportation
 Fiscal Economy Agency of the Ministry of Finance
 Assistant Deputy-ship of Cooperatives and Small & Medium Enterprises Research and Development of the Ministry of Cooperatives and Small & Medium Enterprises
 Trade Policy Analysis and Development Agency of the Ministry of Trade
 Agency for Industrial Research and Development of the Ministry of Industry

Structure 
The structure of ORTKP-EKM is as follows:

 Office of the Head of ORTKP-EKM
 Research Center for Domestic Government
 Research Center for Public Policy
 Research Center for Social Welfare, Village, and Connectivity
 Research Center for Macroeconomics and Finance
 Research Center for Cooperative, Corporation, and People's Economy
 Research Center for Behavioral and Circular Economy
 Research Center for Economics of Industrial, Services, and Trade
 Research Groups

List of Heads

References 

Science and technology in Indonesia
Research institutes in Indonesia
2022 establishments in Indonesia
National Research and Innovation Agency